Ogden Avenue is a street extending from the Near West Side of Chicago to Montgomery, Illinois.  It was named for William B. Ogden, the first mayor of Chicago.

The street follows the route of the Southwestern Plank Road, which opened in 1848 across swampy terrain between Chicago and Riverside, Illinois, and was extended to Naperville by 1851.

The 1909 Plan of Chicago recommended an entire network of new diagonal streets, but the only one ever built was the extension in the 1920s of Ogden from Union Park through the Old Town neighborhood to end at Clark Street opposite Lincoln Park. This extension, largely built in the 1920s, was completed in 1934 with bridges and a connecting viaduct across Goose Island and the North Branch of the Chicago River. In the late 1960s, as part of an urban renewal project for Old Town, the street was vacated in this area and sold off for development. In recent decades, additional portions of Ogden have been abandoned and vacated. The avenue now ends a short distance north of Chicago Avenue.

The street intersects Interstate 90/Interstate 94/Kennedy Expressway in Chicago, Interstate 294/Tri-State Tollway in Western Springs, Interstate 355 in Lisle.

In the 1920s the broad avenue became an important arterial carrying auto traffic through the city's West Side. Portions of the avenue carried U.S. Route 66 from the city through adjacent suburbs. It carried US 32 until 1934. Ogden Avenue used to carry U.S. Route 34 to its end as well. Because of this, the intersection of U.S. Route 34/Ogden Avenue and U.S. Route 12/U.S. Route 20/U.S. Route 45/LaGrange Road is one of the few places where four U.S. Routes intersect. Further outside Chicago, a portion of the roadway from Harlem Avenue through the western suburbs carries U.S. Route 34.  U.S Route 34 carries the name of Ogden Av. from Chicago westbound to Aurora, Illinois.  Ogden Av. ends when U.S. Route 34 leaves Aurora at the intersection of U.S. Route 34 and U.S. Route 30 on the border of Aurora; Montgomery, Illinois; and Oswego, Illinois.

Major intersections

References

External links
 Ogden Avenue history and photography at Forgotten Chicago

Streets in Chicago
U.S. Route 66 in Illinois
U.S. Route 34
Transportation in Kendall County, Illinois
Transportation in DuPage County, Illinois
Transportation in Cook County, Illinois
Oswego, Illinois
Lisle, Illinois
La Grange, Illinois
Cicero, Illinois